Olexandra Shevchenko is a member of the Ukrainian radical feminist protest group FEMEN, which regularly demonstrates topless against manifestations of patriarchy, dictatorship, religion, and the sex industry.

Early life
Shevchenko was born and grew up in Khmelnytskyi (in Ukraine).

FEMEN

Anna Hutsol formed FEMEN in Kyiv on 10 April 2008, with her two friends from their hometown of Khmelnytskyi, Olexandra Shevchenko and Oksana Shachko. They initially protested about issues effecting women students, but rapidly moved on to demonstrating against the sexual exploitation of Ukrainian women. It was in late August 2009 that Oksana Shachko became the first member of the group to bare her breasts during a protest, but it was not until 2010 that this approach became the usual tactic in FEMEN demonstrations, justified on the grounds that without the media attention generated by topless protests their message would not be heard.

In 2011, international news agencies started to pay more attention to this unusual group of Feminist protesters,

In late 2011, Shevchenko, along with Inna Shevchenko and Jenia Kraizman, took their protest onto the international stage. On 31 October 2011 they demonstrated dressed as French maids in Paris against Dominique Strauss-Kahn, on 5 November 2011 they protested against Silvio Berlusconi in Rome, the following day they protested against the Pope outside St. Peters, and on 10 November protested against prostitution in Zurich. On 9 December 2011 Shevchenko was in Moscow demonstrating against Vladimir Putin outside Christ the Saviour Cathedral.

In 2013, Shevchenko established a training facility for FEMEN Germany in Berlin.

On 9 February 2013, Shevchenko protested against female genital mutilation at the Berlin Film Festival - she had the words 'Stop Cutting my Pussy' written across her bare chest.

On 6 March 2013, FEMEN activists (including Shevchenko) in cooperation with French writer Galia Ackerman released their first book called 'FEMEN' published by Calmann-Lévy in French.

In August 2013, Shevchenko fled out of Ukraine.

Bibliography
Ackerman, Galia, with Anna Hutsol, Oksana Shachko, Alexandra 'Sasha' Shevchenko, & Inna Shevchenko,  FEMEN, Published by Calmann-Lévy (Paris 2013), 280 pages. . (French language publication)

Filmography
 "Nos seins, nos armes!" (Our breasts, our weapons!), documentary film (1hour 10 mins), written and directed by Caroline Fourest and Nadia El Fani, produced by Nilaya Productions, aired on France 2 on 5 March 2013.
 Ukraine Is Not a Brothel

See also
 FEMEN France
 Feminism
 Nudity and protest
 Women's rights in Ukraine

References

External links
 
 FEMEN website

Living people
Ukrainian pacifists
Ukrainian human rights activists
Women human rights activists
21st-century Ukrainian women politicians
Ukrainian women's rights activists
Femen
People from Khmelnytskyi, Ukraine
1988 births